The National Blood Clot Alliance or NBCA for short, formerly known as the National Alliance for Thrombosis and Thrombophilia (NATT), is a United States nationwide not-for-profit alliance of patients and medical professionals committed to raising awareness about thrombosis and thrombophilia and is dedicated to preventing and treating health problems caused by blood clots and blood clotting disorders.

Organization 
NBCA is headquartered in Rockville, Maryland. NBCA's mission is to prevent, diagnose and treat thrombosis and thrombophilia through research, education, support and advocacy. The current President is Kathy Smith and NBCA's Executive Director is Joe Issacs.

Activities 
In a 2007 press release, NBCA announced the award of two grants totaling  $1.3 million from the US Centers for Disease Control and Prevention to “launch a national wake-up call to promote public and healthcare professional awareness of this serious medical condition that each year kills nearly 300,000 Americans.”

In July 2014, NBCA launched its "Stop the Clot" website with resources for health professionals, patients and family members including healthcare provider listings, patient stories, a knowledge base of articles and reference materials on blood clots and blood clotting disorders.  NBCA also sponsors educational seminars and publishes materials to raise awareness of blood clotting issues.

References

External links 
 NBCA Official Web Site
 NBCA - Patient Stories
 PR News Story
 CDC Blood Clotting Article
 Thrombophilia Awareness Project
 Anticoagulation Forum
 National Heart Lung and Blood Institute

Medical and health organizations based in Maryland